Croydon, located in Greater London, England,  has a diverse economy with the service and retail sectors now dominating over the town's historical market status. It is today served well by its extensive rail network centering on East and West Croydon stations, from where London Overground, First Capital Connect and Southern operate to most parts of Central and Greater London, as well as Surrey, Sussex, Hampshire and the East of England. With the A23, M23 and M25 orbital motorway intersecting Croydon to the South East, it is the principal gateway of the motorway network from the East Sussex area of the South Coast. London Gatwick Airport is located to the direct south of the town and has scheduled flights to destinations within Europe, North America and Asia, although has tough competition from the even bigger London Heathrow Airport to the west but has managed to stay the UK's second busiest airport. The town has since 2000 had a tram network which has been highly successful, carrying more than 24 million passengers a year. The network has three lines, the routes being; New Addington to West Croydon (returning to New Addington), Wimbledon to Beckenham and Wimbledon to Elmers End, with some off-peak variations. Croydon is one of only five London boroughs not to have any form of London Underground services.

These good transport links have been a major factor contributing to the growth of Croydon, and have led to the town becoming a major centre for distribution. Retail is another major service and employer in the town centre, with a retail economy which has experienced a boom resulting in several new shops. North End is Croydon's main shopping street, with the Whitgift and Allders situated on it. The town centre also includes the famous Surrey Street market, one of the only lasting town centre markets in the Croydon and South London areas, and over 3 indoor shopping centres. The Whitgift Centre and the newest Centrale centre. Park Place will re-establish Croydon as one of the UK's top shopping areas. Plans include the construction of a new shopping centre to replace St George's Walk and older properties on George Street. The proposed redevelopment of Park Place by Minerva and Lend Lease will create a one million square foot destination with over 130 shops, cafes and restaurants, anchored by a new department store which the council hopes will be John Lewis. Other tenants interested have included Habitat, Borders and Gap. Improvements will see Queen's Gardens completely remodelled, together with the construction of a fully integrated public transport hub to include a new bus interchange and tram stop. The building of Park Place will create Europe's largest covered retail area.

Croydon is one of the largest financial centres in the south east outside London and is also home to many legal and insurance firms. Croydon is a major office area in the south east of England, being the largest outside of Central London. In 2007, Croydon leapt up the annual business growth league table, with a 14% rise in new firms trading in the borough after 125 new companies started up, increasing the number from 900 to 1,025, enabling the town, which has also won the Enterprising Britain Award and "the most enterprising borough in London" award, to jump from 31 to 14 in the table.
Malcolm Brabon has stated that "Croydon is home to a variety of international business communities, each with dynamic business networks, so businesses located in Croydon are in a good position to make the most of international trade and recruit from a labour force fluent in 130 languages".

In 2007, Croydon's unemployment rate was 6.3%, compared to 6.9% for the London area and 5.3% for the rest of the United Kingdom. A higher volume of men are unemployed in Croydon than females, with 9.3% out of work compared to 6.1% of females.

The Croydon Community Against Trafficking campaigns against prostitution in Croydon.

The former Mayor of London, Boris Johnson, said he would support Croydon becoming an official city and announced £23m of additional funding to help redevelop the town at the Develop Croydon Conference on 22 November 2011. Several luxury Docklands-style apartment developments have been built in recent years, and several more are being built or planned. Saffron Square, which will include a 45-storey tower, is already under construction, and other developments with towers over 50 floors high have been given planning approval. These include a 54-storey "Menta Tower" in Cherry Orchard Road near East Croydon station, and a 55-storey tower at One Landsdowne Road; the latter, on which construction was set to begin in early 2013, is set to be Britain's tallest block of flats, as well as including office space, a 4 star hotel and a health club.

References 

Media and communications in the London Borough of Croydon
Croydon